Kibbeh (also kubba and other spellings) is a family of dishes based on spiced ground meat, onions, and grain, popular in Middle Eastern cuisine.

In Levantine cuisine, kibbeh is usually made by pounding bulgur wheat together with meat into a fine paste and forming it into balls with toasted pine nuts and spices. It may also be layered and cooked on a tray, deep-fried, grilled, or served raw. In Mesopotamian cuisine, versions with rice or farina are found. Some recipes add semolina.

Kibbeh is considered to be a national dish of Lebanon and Syria, and is a popular dish in the Levant. Versions are found in Cyprus, Egypt, Israel, Iraq, Iran, the Persian Gulf, Armenia, and Turkey, and among Assyrian people. It is also found throughout Latin American countries that received substantial numbers of immigrants from the Levant during the late 19th and early 20th centuries, as well as parts of North America.

Etymology
The words kibbeh and kubba come from the Arabic verb  , meaning "to form into a ball," and is thus cognate with "kebab".

Variations

Near East 
In Levantine cuisine, a variety of dishes made with bulgur (cracked wheat) and minced lamb are called kibbeh. Aleppo is famous for having more than 17 different types. These include kibbeh prepared with sumac (kibbe sumāqiyye), yogurt (kibbe labaniyye), quince (kibbe safarjaliyye), lemon juice (kibbe ḥāmḍa), pomegranate sauce, cherry sauce, and other varieties, such as the "disk" kibbeh (kibbe arāṣ), the "plate" kibbeh (kibbe biṣfīḥa or kibbe bṣēniyye) and the raw kibbeh (kibbeh nayyeh).

Kibbeh nayyeh is a raw dish made from a mixture of bulgur, very finely minced lamb or beef similar to steak tartare, and Middle Eastern spices, served on a platter, frequently as part of a meze in Lebanon and Syria, garnished with mint leaves and olive oil, and served with green onions or scallions, green hot peppers, and pita/pocket bread or markouk bread. Because kibbeh nayyeh is raw, it requires high-quality meat to prepare and has been seen as a traditional way to honor guests.

Kubba Mosul from Iraq is flat and round like a disc. Kubba halab is an Iraqi version of kibbeh created with a rice crust and named after the largest city in Syria, Aleppo. Kubbat Shorba is an Iraqi and Kurdish version prepared as a stew, commonly made with turnips and chard in a tomato-based stew. It is often served with arak and various salads.

A Syrian soup known as kubbi kishk consists of kubbi "torpedoes" or "footballs" in a yogurt (kishk) and butter broth with stewed cabbage leaves. Another soup, known as kibbeh hamda, consists of chicken stock with vegetables (usually leeks, celery, turnips and courgettes), lemon juice and garlic, with small kibbeh made with ground rice as dumplings. In the Syrian Jewish diaspora this is popular both at Pesach and as the pre-fast meal on the day before Yom Kippur.

South America 

On Colombia's Caribbean coast, the most local variations of the dish use ground beef instead of lamb, but the original recipe, or one with mixture of beef and lamb, can be found served by the large Middle Eastern population of the zone. The dish has acquired almost vernacular presence and is frequently served in social occasions at both Arab and non-Arab households. When served as an adopted local dish, it is offered often as a starter along with other regional delicacies, including empanadas, deditos and carimañolas.

Brazilian , is sometimes stuffed with catupiry or requeijão,  a sauce resembling ricotta and cream cheese of Portuguese origin. Most Brazilian kibbeh uses only ground beef, and not other types of meat. Other variations include tahini,  (texturized soy protein),  (Japanese wheat gluten-based meat substitute) or tofu (soybean curd) as stuffing.

Some regional Jewish cuisines combine kibbeh with elements taken from Latin American cuisine, for example, it is typical of Syrian Jews in Mexico to eat the traditional kibbeh with salsa verde.

See also
 List of Middle Eastern dishes
 List of deep fried foods
List of stuffed dishes

References

Appetizers
Arab cuisine
Armenian cuisine
Assyrian cuisine
Cypriot cuisine
Egyptian cuisine
Iranian cuisine
Iraqi cuisine
Israeli cuisine
Jordanian cuisine
Kurdish cuisine
Lebanese cuisine
Levantine cuisine
Palestinian cuisine
Syrian cuisine
Stuffed dishes
National dishes
Street food
Deep fried foods
Semolina dishes
Meat dishes
Bulgur dishes
Colombian cuisine
Turkish cuisine
Brazilian cuisine
Mizrahi Jewish cuisine
Wheat dishes
Fried foods
Middle Eastern cuisine

ku:Kutilk